The 2017–18 Arizona Wildcats men's basketball team represented the University of Arizona during the 2017–18 NCAA Division I men's basketball season. The team was led by ninth-year head coach Sean Miller, and played their home games at McKale Center in Tucson, Arizona as members in the Pac-12 Conference. They finished the season 27–8, 14–4 in Pac-12 play to win the regular season championship. They defeated Colorado, UCLA, and USC to win the Pac-12 tournament. As a result, they received the conference's automatic bid to the NCAA tournament where, as a No. 4 seed, they were upset in the First Round by No. 13 seed Buffalo.

Due to 2017–18 NCAA Division I men's basketball corruption scandal, 18 wins from this season have been vacated.  The following 9 wins against Northern Arizona, UMBC, Cal State Bakersfield, Long Beach State, UNLV, Texas A&M, Utah, Colorado & California would count in the overall record as the player involved in the scandal did not play in these games.

Previous season

Entering the 2016–17 season, Arizona had been ranked in 78 consecutive AP polls and 81-straight Coaches polls. The Wildcats were ranked every week extending their streak to 97 weeks for the AP and 100 weeks for the Coaches poll. The 97 consecutive weeks in the AP poll is currently the second-longest streak in the nation behind Kansas at 161 weeks. Arizona won its first 10 conference games, the best start since the 1997–98 season when they started 16–0. During the season, Arizona was invited and participated in the Armed Forces Classic in Honolulu. Arizona defeated Michigan State. Arizona also defeated Texas A&M in the Lone Star Shootout in Houston. Arizona also defeated Sacred Heart, Northern Colorado and Santa Clara but lost to Butler in the championship game of the Las Vegas Invitational in Paradise, NV.

They finished the season 32–5, 16–2 in Pac-12 play to finish in a first place tie with Oregon. The championship marked the school's 15th Pac-12 regular season championship title. As the No. 2 seed in the Pac-12 tournament, Arizona defeated Colorado, UCLA and Oregon (avenged from 85 to 58 loss on February 4 in Eugene, OR) to win the sixth Pac-12 tournament championship title since 2002. As a result, the Wildcats received the conference's automatic bid to the NCAA tournament for the fifth consecutive year (32nd NCAA tournament appearances). As a No. 2 seed in the West region, they defeated North Dakota 100–82 and Saint Mary's 69–60 to advance to the Sweet Sixteen. However, in the Sweet Sixteen, they lost to No. 11 seed Xavier 71–73.

Offseason

2017 recruiting class
Tempe, Arizona product Alex Barcello was the first commitment in the Arizona class. He committed to Arizona on August 26 at a press conference at his high school. He chose Arizona over Butler, Indiana, Stanford and Virginia. He was a consensus four star prospect, and was ranked the consensus No. 93 overall player by the four main recruiting services.

Deandre Ayton, a Bahamian attending school in Phoenix, was the second commitment in the Arizona class. He committed to Arizona on September 6 live on ESPN. He chose Arizona for an upset over Kansas and Kentucky. He was a consensus five star prospect, and was ranked the consensus No. 2 overall player by the four main recruiting services.

Brandon Randolph, originally from Yonkers, New York, was the third commitment in the Arizona class. He committed to Arizona on October 12. He chose Arizona over Syracuse, Oregon and Wake Forest. He was a consensus top fifty player, ranked No. 42 by the four main recruiting services.

Ira Lee, from Los Angeles, was the fourth commitment in the Arizona class. He committed to Arizona on October 20. He chose Arizona over California and Oregon. He was a consensus top-25 player and ranked as a four-star player by the four main recruiting services Rivals, ESPN, Scout, and 24/7 Sports.

Emmanuel Akot from Winnipeg, CA, was the first commitment in the 2018 Arizona class, but he will reclassified to 2017 class (fifth and final commitment). He committed to Arizona on March 9 at a press conference at his high school. He chose Arizona over Louisville, Oregon and Utah. He was a consensus five star prospect, and was ranked the consensus No. 21 overall player by the four main recruiting services.

Arizona also added Preferred Walk-on Matt Weyand from Mater Dei High School in Santa Ana, California.

 

School Offers by Recruit

ESPN 100

 Alex Barcello: Arizona, Butler, Indiana, Stanford and Virginia
 Brandon Randolph: Arizona Syracuse, Oregon and Wake Forest
 Ira Lee: Arizona, California and Oregon
 Deandre Ayton: Arizona, Kansas and Kentucky 
 Emmanuel Akot: Arizona, Louisville, Oregon and Utah

FBI investigation

On September 26, federal prosecutors in New York announced charges of fraud and corruption against 10 people involved in college basketball, including Arizona assistant coach Emmanuel "Book" Richardson. The charges allege that Richardson and others allegedly received payments from financial advisers and others to influence student-athletes to retain their services and in turn used those payments to secure recruits. Following the news, Richardson was suspended and relieved of all duties. On January 11, 2018, UA fired assistant basketball coach Book Richardson after his appeal failed.

On February 23, 2018, according to a published report by ESPN, an FBI wiretap revealed that head coach Sean Miller talked with Christian Dawkins (another key figure in the scandal) to discuss paying their top prospect, Deandre Ayton, $100,000 to commit to Arizona, with the monetary situation being dealt with directly with him. While Miller would not coach their next game that day against Oregon, Arizona allowed Ayton to play. Coach Sean Miller subsequently denied the allegation and the University of Arizona announced he will remain the coach of Arizona Wildcats men's basketball team, with Ayton also allowed to continue playing with the team for the rest of the season. However, as a consequence of the report involving Ayton, both of Arizona's remaining committed recruits from the class of 2018, Shareef O'Neal and Brandon Williams, announced they had decommitted.

Personnel

Roster

 

Aug 23, 2017 – Sophomore walk-on Kory Jones will miss the 2017–18 season after tearing his left ACL.
Sept 27, 2017 – Sophomore Rawle Alkins out 8–12 weeks with a broken right foot.
Feb 22, 2018 – Junior Allonzo Trier ruled ineligible by NCAA for testing positive of a banned substance.

Depth chart

Coaching staff

Preseason

Summer Exhibition Tour 
Practices began earlier than otherwise allowed by the NCAA in preparation for a three-game foreign tour to Spain in August. (NCAA rules allow teams to conduct 10 practices in preparation for a foreign tour.) NCAA rules allow for foreign tours once every four years and the Spain tour was Arizona's first since 2012. It was the eighth in program history. The University of Arizona basketball program will travel to Spain in August for a foreign tour, including a trio of exhibition games. The Wildcats will spend time in Barcelona and Valencia Aug. 11 through Aug. 19.

UA will take on Combinado Valenciano on Saturday, Aug. 13 at 7 p.m. local at the Pabellon Municipal Fuente de San Luis in Valencia.

The trip's second exhibition features Arizona and the Mataro All-Stars on Wednesday, August 16 at 7:10 p.m. in Barcelona inside the Pavello Municipal Teresa Maria Roca prior to the final exhibition two days later against Mataro Parc Boet in the same arena.

All three of the exhibitions will be streamed online by FloHoops.com with a subscription required.

Red and Blue game 
The annual Red-Blue game will take place at McKale Center on October 20, 2017. After freshman Brandon Randolph won the dunk contest, the Blue team, led by Deandre Ayton, knocked off the Red team, 55–37.

Preseason rankings 
For the fifth time in the past six seasons, Arizona Wildcats voted 2017-18 Pac-12 preseason favorite by media poll.  On October 19, Arizona was pre-season ranked 5th in USA Today coaches preseason poll. On November 1, Arizona was pre-season ranked No. 3 in AP Top 25 preseason poll.

In its preseason college preview, Lindy's Sports ranked the Wildcats No. 2 in the country. The Blue Ribbon Yearbook ranked UA No. 2 in its preseason rankings. Athlon Sports ranked the Wildcats No. 1 in the country. Street & Smith ranked UA No. 1 in the country. KenPom ranked UA No. 3 in the country. NBC Sports ranked the Wildcats No. 3 in the country. CBS Sports ranked No. 2 for the Wildcats. ESPN ranked No. 2 for the Wildcats. Sports Illustrated ranked UA No. 1 in the country.

Schedule and results
On June 8, Arizona released the non-conference schedule is highlighted by marquee match-ups at McKale Center and across the country. Arizona will also host Alabama, Cal State Bakersfield, UConn, Long Beach State, North Dakota State, Northern Arizona and UMBC in Tucson, AZ. Arizona will travel to Phoenix to play Texas A&M at Talking Stick Resort Arena in the annual Valley of the Sun Shootout, to Nassau, Bahamas to play three of the following teams: (NC State, Northern Iowa, Purdue, SMU, Tennessee, Villanova or Western Kentucky) in the Battle 4 Atlantis at Imperial Arena, to Alburquerque to play against New Mexico, and finally face UNLV in Paradise, NV.

The 2018 Pac-12 Tournament will begin March 7 in Las Vegas and conclude on March 10. Selection Sunday occurs the following day.

In the unbalanced 18-game Pac-12 schedule, Arizona will not play the Washington teams (Washington/Washington State) at home and Los Angeles teams (UCLA/USC) on the road.
|-
!colspan=12 style=| Spain Exhibition Tour

|-
!colspan=12 style=| Exhibition

|-
!colspan=12 style=| Non-conference regular season

|-
!colspan=12 style=|  Pac-12 regular season

|-
!colspan=12 style=| Pac-12 Tournament

|-
!colspan=12 style=| NCAA tournament

Schedule Source: ArizonaWildcats.com

Ranking movement

Number in italic indicates the number of first place votes
^Coaches did not release a Week 2 poll.
*AP does not release post-NCAA Tournament rankings

Player statistics

Awards and honors

Weekly awards
Allonzo Trier
Week 1, Pac-12 Player of the Week (Nov. 13) 
NBC Sports Player of the Week (Nov. 13)
Deandre Ayton
 Week 4, Pac–12 Player of the Week (Dec. 4)
 Wayman Tisdale National Freshman of the Week (Dec 10)
 Wayman Tisdale National Freshman of the Week (2) (Feb 25)
NCAA Men's Player of the Week (Jan. 1)
NBC Sports Player of the Week (Jan. 1)
Pac-12 Player of the Week (2) (Jan. 2)
Dusan Ristic
Pac-12 Player of the Week (Jan. 29)

Watchlists
Allonzo Trier
Jerry West Award Preseason Watch List (2018)
Oscar Robertson Award Preseason Watch List (2018)
Lute Olson Award Preseason Watch List (2018)
Naismith Trophy Award Preseason Watch List (2018)
John R. Wooden Award Preseason Watch List (2018)
John R. Wooden Award Midseason Top 25 (2018)
Rawle Alkins
Julius Erving Award Preseason Watch List (2018)
Naismith Trophy Award Preseason Watch List (2018)
John R. Wooden Award Preseason Watch List (2018)
Deandre Ayton
Karl Malone Award Preseason Watch List (2018) 
Oscar Robertson Award Preseason Watch List (2018)
Naismith Trophy Award Preseason Watch List (2018)
John R. Wooden Award Preseason Watch List (2018)
John R. Wooden Award Midseason Top 25 (2018)
Oscar Robertson Trophy Midseason Watch List (2018)
Karl Malone Award Finalist (2018) 
Naismith Trophy Award Finalist (2018)
Dušan Ristić
Kareem Abdul-Jabbar Award Preseason Watch List (2018)

Pac-12 awards
Deandre Ayton
Pac-12 Tournament Most Outstanding Player (2018)
Pac-12 Player of the Year (2018)
Pac-12 Freshman Player of the Year (2018)

National district awards
Deandre Ayton
USBWA District IX Player of the Year (2018)

All-American and national awards
Allonzo Trier
AP Pac-12 First Team All-American (2018)
AP Preseason First Team All-American (2017)
Street & Smith Preseason Second Team All-American (2017)
NBC Sports Preseason First Team All-American (2017) 
ESPN Preseason First Team All-American (2017)
Sports Illustrated Preseason First Team All-American (2017)
USA Today Preseason First Team All-American (2017)
Blue Ribbon Preseason Second Team All-American (2017)
Athlon Sports Preseason Second Team All-American (2017)
Sporting News Preseason Second Team All-American (2017)
USBWA District IX All-District Team (2018)
NABC District 20 Second Team (2018)
AP All-American Honorable mention (2018)
Deandre Ayton
Karl Malone Power Forward of the Year Award (2018)
AP Pac-12 Player of the Year (2018)
AP Pac-12 Newcomer of the Year (2018)
AP Pac-12 First Team All-American (2018)
NBC Sports First Team All-American (2018) 
AP Preseason Second Team All-American (2017)
NBC Sports Preseason Third Team All-American (2017)
Blue Ribbon Preseason Third Team All-American (2017)
Athlon Sports Preseason Third Team All-American (2017)
Sporting News Preseason Third Team All-American (2017)
Sports Illustrated Preseason Honorable Mention All-American (2017)
USA Today Preseason Honorable Mention All-American (2017)
USA Today First Team All-American (2018)
Sporting News First Team All-American (2018)
USBWA District IX All-District Team (2018)
USBWA First Team All-American (2018)
NABC First Team All-American (2018)
NABC District 20 First team (2018)
AP First Team All-American (2018)

All-Pac-12 team
Deandre Ayton
All Pac-12 First team (2018)
All Pac-12 Freshman team (2018)
All Pac-12 Defensive team (2018)
Allonzo Trier
All Pac-12 First team (2018)
Dusan Ristic
All Pac-12 Second team (2018)
Rawle Alkins
All Pac-12 Honorable mention (2018)

All-Pac-12 tournament team
Deandre Ayton
All Pac-12 tournament team (2018) 
Dusan Ristic
All Pac-12 tournament team (2018)

See also
2017–18 Arizona Wildcats women's basketball team

References

2017-18
2017–18 Pac-12 Conference men's basketball season
2017 in sports in Arizona
2018 in sports in Arizona
Arizona
2017-18